The Lecky Professorship of History, previously the Lecky Professorship of Modern History is a chair at Trinity College Dublin.

The professorship was founded in 1913 in memory of William Edward Hartpole Lecky, with an endowment from his widow.

Lecky Professors of History
 Walter Alison Phillips, 1914–1939.
 Edmund Curtis, 1939–1943
 Constantia Maxwell, 1945–1951
 A. J. Otway-Ruthven, 1951-1980
 J. F. Lydon, 1980-1993
 I. S. Robinson, 1993-2015
 Ruth Mazo Karras, 2018–present

Notes

1913 establishments in Ireland
History, Lecky
History, Lecky